Hyolithellus is a conical tubular fossil from the Cambrian, originally considered a hyolith but since reinterpreted tentatively as an annelid worm.

Its circular, thin (15–150 μm), originally phosphatic tube gets wider along its long, undulating, annulated length.

References

Cambrian invertebrates
Prehistoric annelid genera
Paleontology in Washington (state)
Paleozoic life of New Brunswick
Paleozoic life of Newfoundland and Labrador
Paleozoic life of the Northwest Territories
Paleozoic life of Nova Scotia
Paleozoic life of Quebec

Cambrian genus extinctions